Mark Willadsen (born February 17, 1955) is an American politician who has served in the South Dakota House of Representatives from the 11th district since 2015. He previously served in the South Dakota House of Representatives from 2005 to 2009 and from 2011 to 2013.

References

1955 births
Living people
Politicians from Sioux Falls, South Dakota
Republican Party members of the South Dakota House of Representatives
21st-century American politicians